Tomohiko Ito may refer to:

 Tomohiko Ito (footballer) (born 1978), Japanese footballer
 Tomohiko Itō (director) (born 1978), Japanese anime director